Proriedelia is a genus of parasitic flies in the family Tachinidae. There is one described species in Proriedelia, P. petiolata.

Distribution
Myanmar.

References

Dexiinae
Monotypic Brachycera genera
Diptera of Asia
Tachinidae genera